Idlewild is an unincorporated community located in the town of Nasewaupee, Door County, Wisconsin, United States.

Sherwood Point Light
Sherwood Point Light is a lighthouse located near Idlewild.

Climate

References

External links 
Nellie Grant at Idlewild, Door County Advocate, July 27, 1882
Tales of Thrilling Pioneer Days at Idlewild: Sherwood's "Buried Treasure" at Site of Present Pines Resort Recalled by Harry E. Dankoler, Door County Advocate, Volume 74, Number 27, September 13, 1935, page 4  

Unincorporated communities in Door County, Wisconsin
Unincorporated communities in Wisconsin